Bringer of Pain is the fourth full-length album by the heavy metal band Battle Beast, released on February 17, 2017. It is the first album without lead guitarist, backing vocalist, and lead songwriter Anton Kabanen.

Track listing

Personnel

Battle Beast 
 Noora Louhimo – lead vocals
 Joona Björkroth – lead guitar
 Juuso Soinio – rhythm guitar
 Eero Sipilä – bass, backing vocals
 Pyry Vikki – drums
 Janne Björkroth – keyboards

Guest appearances 
 Tomi Joutsen (Amorphis) – vocals (track 6)

Charts

References 

2017 albums
Battle Beast (band) albums
Nuclear Blast albums